Philip Efiong (also spelled Effiong,  18 November 1925 – 6 November 2003) was the first Vice President and the second President of the now defunct Republic of Biafra during the Nigerian Civil War of 1967 to 1970.

Early life
Born in Ibiono Ibom in present-day Akwa Ibom State, Nigeria, on 18 November 1925, Philip Effiong joined the Nigerian Armed Forces on 28 July 1945. He quickly rose through the ranks until on 11 January 1956 he received the Queen's Commission following his officer cadet training at Eaton Hall in Chester. The UK later commissioned him for duty in the Rhine, West Germany. He was then transferred to the Nigeria Army Ordnance Corps; then to England for further training after a peace-keeping stint in the Republic of Congo in 1961. He was Nigeria's first Director of Ordnance. His son is his namesake.

Biafra
Efiong became Chief of General Staff of Biafra under Head of State, Odumegwu Ojukwu during the Nigeria-Biafra war.

The tactics of the Nigerian military during the war included economic blockade and deliberate destruction of agricultural land.  Even before the war, the area was a net importer of food, depending on income from its oil fields to feed its populace.

With the blockade cutting off oil revenue and agricultural destruction reducing food production, the result was mass dislocation and starvation of the populace. Two to three million people are thought to have died in the conflict, mostly through starvation and illness.

When Biafra's military resistance collapsed, Ojukwu fled to Côte d'Ivoire.

Effiong became acting Biafra Head of State

Efiong assumed leadership in this situation of turmoil, starvation, and collapse.  He became acting Head of State of Biafra on 8 January 1970 and on 12 January announced surrender.

Effiong's Speech to Gowon

On 15 January 1970 at Dodan Barracks in Lagos, in the presence of General Yakubu Gowon, Effiong announced the end of the Biafran conflict.

"I, Major-General Phillip Efiong, Officer Administering the Government of the Republic of Biafra, now wish to make the following declaration:
That we affirm that we are loyal Nigerian citizens and accept the authority of the Federal Military Government of Nigeria.
That we accept the existing administrative and political structure of the Federation of Nigeria.
That any future constitutional arrangement will be worked out by representatives of the people of Nigeria.
That the Republic of Biafra hereby ceases to exist."

At the time of the surrender, Effiong believed that the situation was hopeless and that prolonging the conflict would have led only to the further destruction and starvation of the people of Biafra. At that time Effiong said, "I am convinced now that a stop must be put to the bloodshed which is going on as a result of the war. I am also convinced that the suffering of our people must be brought to an immediate end."

Nnaemeka L. Aneke wrote, "General Efiong’s handling of Biafra’s surrender is one of the most tactical and devoted maneuvers ever seen on the Nigerian scene.  Those who do not appreciate the depth of it may not have appreciated what was at stake as Biafra capitulated." Many observers had expected wholesale retribution at war's end.

Later life
In a 1996 interview, Effiong reflected on those events:

I have no regrets whatsoever of my involvement in Biafra or the role I played. The war deprived me of my property, dignity, my name. Yet, I saved so many souls on both sides and by this, I mean Biafra and Nigeria.  . . .

I felt that I played a role which has kept this country united till today. . . .

At the end of it all when I saw they (Biafran soldiers) could no longer continue and Ojukwu had fled, I did what was ideal after wide consultation . . . 

Efiong died 6 November 2003, at the age of 77 less than two weeks before his 78th birthday.

References

"Bidding farewell to 2003", Daily Times of Nigeria, 7 January 2004, lists the date of death as 7 November 2003, and the age at death as 79, perhaps because the death date was so close to Efiong's 79th birthday.
The Biafra-Nigeria Civil War of 1967–70
http://www.philip-effiong.com/Dad-Memory The site of Philip Effiong the Second

1925 births
2003 deaths
People from Akwa Ibom State
Presidents of Biafra
Vice presidents
Biafran Armed Forces personnel